127 Hours is a 2010 British independent biographical adventure film directed by Danny Boyle. It stars James Franco in the principal role as real-life mountain climber Aron Ralston, whose hand was trapped under a boulder in a Utah ravine for more than five days in April 2003. Adapted from Ralston's autobiography Between a Rock and a Hard Place, 127 Hourss screenplay was written by Boyle and Simon Beaufoy. Distributors Fox Searchlight and Pathé gave the feature limited releases in the United States and United Kingdom on 5 November 2010 and 7 January 2011, respectively. It grossed £35.8 million at the box office by the end of its worldwide theatrical run. Rotten Tomatoes, a review aggregator surveyed 215 reviews and judged 93% to be positive.
Additionally, 127 Hours appeared on more than two dozen movie reviewers' Top Ten lists for the best movies of 2010.

The film has received honors for its direction, music, cinematography and writing, as well as for the lead performance by Franco. At the 68th Golden Globe Awards ceremony, 127 Hours earned three nominations: for Best Actor – Motion Picture Drama, Best Original Score and Best Screenplay. The picture was nominated in nine Satellite Award categories, including direction, score, sound, original song and visual effects. It also received nine nominations from the Broadcast Film Critics Association. The 64th British Academy Film Awards nominated it for eight of their awards, including Best Director, Best Editing, Best Music and Best Sound. Additionally, 127 Hours was nominated for the BAFTA Award for Best Film, but lost to The King's Speech. It performed similarly at the 83rd Academy Awards, where it was nominated in six categories: Best Actor, Best Adapted Screenplay, Best Film Editing, Best Original Score, Best Original Song (for "If I Rise") and Best Picture, but lost respectively in all categories to The King's Speech, The Social Network, and Toy Story 3.

Franco was named Best Actor by the New York Film Critics Online and 2010 Independent Spirit Awards. He also received recognition from the Screen Actors Guild, at their 17th annual ceremony. Franco's arm amputation scene towards the end of 127 Hours was nominated at the viewer-voted 2011 MTV Movie Awards. Boyle's and Beaufoy's efforts on the movie's script earned them nominations from the Writers Guild of America and Evening Standard British Film Awards. Along with producer Christian Colson, Boyle garnered another nomination, this time from the Producers Guild of America. The Detroit Film Critics Society honored Boyle as Best Director. Suttirat Larlarb's input on the movie's production design earned her one nomination from the Art Directors Guild. The film's cinematography garnered nominations at the 2010 Houston Film Critics Awards and the 2010 San Diego Film Critics Society Awards. The American Film Institute listed 127 Hours as one of the ten best movies of 2010.

Accolades

See also 
 2010 in film

References
General

Specific

External links
 

Lists of accolades by film